The First Sirimavo Bandaranaike cabinet was the central government of Ceylon led by Prime Minister Sirimavo Bandaranaike between 1960 and 1965. It was formed in July 1960 after the parliamentary election and it ended in March 1965 after the opposition's victory in the parliamentary election.

Cabinet members

Parliamentary secretaries

References

1960 establishments in Ceylon
1965 disestablishments in Ceylon
Cabinets established in 1960
Cabinets disestablished in 1965
Cabinet of Sri Lanka
Ministries of Elizabeth II